Thyas is a genus of moths in the family Erebidae. The genus was erected by Jacob Hübner in 1824.

Species
 Thyas androgyna (Berio, 1954)
 Thyas arcifera (Hampson, 1913)
 Thyas coronata (Fabricius, 1775)
 Thyas honesta Hübner, 1824
 Thyas javanica (Gaede, 1917)
 Thyas juno (Dalman, 1823)
 Thyas metaphaea (Hampson, 1913)
 Thyas meterythra (Hampson, 1918)
 Thyas miniacea (Felder & Rogenhofer, 1874)
 Thyas minians (Mabille, 1884)
 Thyas nubilata (Holland, 1920)
 Thyas parallelipipeda (Guenée, 1852)
 Thyas quadrilineata (Strand, 1912)
 Thyas rubricata (Holland, 1894)

Gallery

References

External links

Ophiusini
Moth genera